Pipeline Express was a steel roller coaster located at Boardwalk Fun Park in Grand Prairie, Texas. When built in 1992, the coaster was the newest Auto Sled model from Bailey Manufacturing of Cameron, Ontario. The five sleds could hold one rider each.

In September 1992, an accident on the coaster threw a 12-year-old girl some  into an unused pool beneath it causing her to slip into a coma and suffer brain trauma. It was closed following the accident. The girl's parents sued the park for negligence and deceptive trade practices.

The coaster never reopened and remained standing until 1997, when it was demolished along with the rest of the park.

References

Former roller coasters in Texas